Fairy Fern Seed is a 1915 American short silent drama film directed by Jack Harvey for Thanhouser, and starring Madeline and Marion Fairbanks, Ethel Jewett, Peggy Burke, Zadee Burbank, and James Cooley.

References

External links

1915 films
American silent short films
American black-and-white films
1915 short films
1915 drama films
Films directed by Jack Harvey
Thanhouser Company films
Silent American drama films
1910s American films